Iziaq Adeyanju (sometimes written Iziak Adeyanju; born 21 October 1959) is a Nigerian former sprinter who competed in the 1984 Summer Olympics and in the 1988 Summer Olympics.

In the 4 x 100 metres relay he won a gold medal at the 1982 Commonwealth Games and the 1985 African Championships, and also finished seventh with the African team at the 1985 World Cup.

He won a 100/200 m double at the Nigerian Athletics Championships in 1988.

References

External links

1959 births
Living people
Nigerian male sprinters
Olympic male sprinters
Olympic athletes of Nigeria
Athletes (track and field) at the 1984 Summer Olympics
Athletes (track and field) at the 1988 Summer Olympics
Commonwealth Games competitors for Nigeria
Commonwealth Games gold medallists for Nigeria
Commonwealth Games gold medallists in athletics
Athletes (track and field) at the 1982 Commonwealth Games
African Championships in Athletics winners
Nigerian Athletics Championships winners
Yoruba sportspeople
20th-century Nigerian people
21st-century Nigerian people
Medallists at the 1982 Commonwealth Games